Mohamed Bakir El-Nakib commonly known as Hamada El-Nakib (born 6 April 1974) is an Egyptian handball goalkeeper, playing on the Egypt men's national handball team. He has participated in four Olympics, in 1996 (6th place), 2000 (7th place), 2004 (12th place) and 2008 (10th place).

At the 2008 Olympics he was ranked as the third-best keeper when measuring the saving percent, saving 40 percent of the shots. He was part of the Egyptian team that won the African Handball Nations Championship in 2008, and qualified for the 2009 World Men's Handball Championship.

References

1974 births
Living people
Egyptian male handball players
Handball players at the 1996 Summer Olympics
Handball players at the 2000 Summer Olympics
Handball players at the 2004 Summer Olympics
Handball players at the 2008 Summer Olympics
Olympic handball players of Egypt
African Games gold medalists for Egypt
African Games medalists in handball
Competitors at the 2011 All-Africa Games
Competitors at the 2013 Mediterranean Games
Mediterranean Games gold medalists for Egypt
Mediterranean Games medalists in handball
21st-century Egyptian people